Muhammad Jifri Muthukkoya, known with the honorific Sayyid, suffixed Thangal, is an Islamic scholar from Kerala, India. He serves as President, Samastha Kerala Jem'iyyathul Ulema, the body of Sunni-Shafi'i scholars in northern Kerala. 

He succeeded Kumaramputhur A. P. Muhammed Musliyar as the president of the Samastha in 2016.

References 

20th-century Muslim scholars of Islam
Malayali people
Indian Islamic religious leaders
People from Malappuram district
People from Kasaragod district
Shafi'is
Indian Sunni Muslims
1957 births
Living people
Kerala Sunni-Shafi'i scholars